Adobe Creek is a river that flows for 11 miles in a northeastern direction to Clear Lake in Lake County, California. Species that inhabit the river include the California roach (Hesperoleucus symmetricus).

References

Rivers of Lake County, California